Axel Mariault (born 7 June 1998) is a French racing cyclist racing for UCI WorldTeam .

Career
On 30 September 2022 it was announced Mariault would join UCI WorldTeam  on a two-year contract from 2023.

Major results
Sources:
2016
 8th Ronde des Vallées
2022
 9th Tour du Limousin

References

External links

1998 births
Living people
French male cyclists